The First Presbyterian Church is a Presbyterian Church (USA) church, and is the name of its historic church building, in Cookeville, Tennessee. The congregation was established in 1867; its building was constructed in 1910. It was designed in the Greek Revival architectural style. It has been listed on the National Register of Historic Places since December 28, 2010.

Further reading

References

External links
First Presbyterian Church (U.S.A.), Cookeville, TN, official site

Churches completed in 1910
Churches on the National Register of Historic Places in Tennessee
National Register of Historic Places in Putnam County, Tennessee
Greek Revival architecture in Tennessee